Penn Lake Park is a borough in Luzerne County, Pennsylvania, United States. The population was 359 at the 2020 census.

History
The community was founded in 1938, after ice salesman Albert Lewis used the lake to chip out his product. In 1946, Harry and Mary Goeringer bought the lake — and the 800 acres around it — from Lewis. They built a house by the lake; they later divided the rest of the land into parcels. It became a borough in 1976, when Penn Lake Park applied for a state grant because the lake's dam needed a major repair.

Geography

Demographics

As of the census of 2000, there were 269 people, 118 households, and 84 families residing in the borough. The population density was 137.5 people per square mile (53.0/km2). There were 222 housing units at an average density of 113.5 per square mile (43.7/km2). The racial makeup of the borough was 98.88% White, 1.12% from other races. Hispanic or Latino of any race were 0.74% of the population.

There were 118 households, out of which 23.7% had children under the age of 18 living with them, 63.6% were married couples living together, 5.1% had a female householder with no husband present, and 28.0% were non-families. 22.0% of all households were made up of individuals, and 9.3% had someone living alone who was 65 years of age or older. The average household size was 2.28 and the average family size was 2.67.

In the borough the population was spread out, with 19.0% under the age of 18, 5.6% from 18 to 24, 26.4% from 25 to 44, 31.2% from 45 to 64, and 17.8% who were 65 years of age or older. The median age was 45 years. For every 100 females there were 105.3 males. For every 100 females age 18 and over, there were 98.2 males.

The median income for a household in the borough was $45,139, and the median income for a family was $50,000. Males had a median income of $29,018 versus $26,000 for females. The per capita income for the borough was $20,437. About 5.7% of families and 4.4% of the population were below the poverty line, including none of those under the age of eighteen and 20.8% of those sixty five or over.

References

External links

Populated places established in 1938
Boroughs in Luzerne County, Pennsylvania
1938 establishments in Pennsylvania